Gabriel y Gabriela is a Mexican telenovela produced by Patricia Lozano for Televisa in 1982. It starred by Ana Martín, Jorge Rivero, Jorge Martínez de Hoyos and Liliana Abud.

Plot
The first part of the story takes place in 60's. It's the love story between Gabriela and Renato. The viewers will witness their marriage, the birth of their daughter, also named Gabriela and Renato's death from Nicando's hand. The second part takes place in 80's. Gabriela is the grown daughter of Gabriela and Renato. She has a rebel personality and she pretends to be a man in order to sail on a boat. Then she will be courted by two men: Carlos and Fernando. At the end it's unclear whom she marries, because the viewers only see a hand that receives her at the altar.

Cast

Awards

Trivia 
This was the only Mexican telenovela dubbed in Cebuano and Hiligaynon languages in the Philippines, now of regionals played by GMA Iloilo, Cebu and Davao.

References

External links

1982 telenovelas
Mexican comics titles
Mexican telenovelas
1982 Mexican television series debuts
1983 Mexican television series endings
Spanish-language telenovelas
Television shows set in Mexico
Televisa telenovelas
Television shows based on comics